Astralium nakamineae is a species of sea snail, a marine gastropod mollusk in the family Turbinidae, the turban snails.

References

External links
 To World Register of Marine Species

nakamineae
Gastropods described in 1981